Maxwell Reid Thurman (February 18, 1931 – December 1, 1995) was a United States Army general, who served as Vice Chief of Staff of the United States Army and commander of United States Army Training and Doctrine Command.

Early life and education
Thurman attended North Carolina State University, graduating with a bachelor's degree in chemical engineering (ceramics). While in college he was a member of the Professional Engineering Fraternity Theta Tau.

Military career
Thurman was commissioned a second lieutenant of Ordnance from NCSU's ROTC program in 1953 and branch transferred to Field Artillery. His first assignment was with the 11th Airborne Division, and in 1958 his Honest John Rocket platoon was deployed to Lebanon.

From 1961 to 1963 Thurman served in South Vietnam as an Intelligence Officer for South Vietnam's I Corps. Following his service in Vietnam, Thurman became one of the few non-Academy graduates ever assigned as a company tactical officer at the United States Military Academy. In 1966 he attended the Command and General Staff College, then returned to South Vietnam in 1967, where he assumed command of the 2d Howitzer Battalion, 35th Field Artillery Regiment in 1968.

Later assignments
After completing the United States Army War College in 1970, Thurman held numerous troop and staff assignments before assuming command of United States Army Recruiting Command in 1979, where he initiated the highly successful "BE ALL YOU CAN BE" recruiting campaign. From 1981 to 1983 he was Deputy Chief of Staff of the Army, Personnel (DCSPER) and from 1983 to 1987 he was the Vice Chief of Staff of the United States Army.

In 1989 Thurman applied for retirement while serving as Commanding General, United States Army Training and Doctrine Command. Instead, he was handpicked by President George H. W. Bush to be Commander-in-Chief, United States Southern Command (USSOUTHCOM). In this position, he planned and executed Operation Just Cause, the 1989 invasion of Panama.

Later life and death
Thurman was diagnosed with acute myelogenous leukemia while still commander in chief of USSOUTHCOM, shortly after Operation Just Cause. He retired in 1991 after more than thirty-seven years of service, and died in 1995 at Walter Reed Army Medical Center in Washington, aged 64. A funeral service was held on December 7, 1995 at the Fort Myer, Virginia, chapel, followed by interment at Arlington National Cemetery (Section 30, Grave 416-A-LH).

Thurman, a lifelong bachelor, was survived by his brother, the late army Lieutenant General John R. Thurman III.

Honors
Thurman's awards and decorations include the Defense Distinguished Service Medal, the Army Distinguished Service Medal, the Legion of Merit and the Bronze Star Medal with "V" device. In August 2010 Thurman was posthumously inducted into the Theta Tau Alumni Hall of Fame for outstanding contribution to his profession.

Legacy
An award is given every year by the United States Army Medical Research and Materiel Command (MRMC) in honor of General Thurman. The award is generally presented at the annual meeting of the American Telemedicine Association.

Thurman's image as a workaholic – captured by the nickname "Mad Max" – was as widespread as his reputation as a master organizer. His posting as chief of U.S. Army Recruiting Command in 1979 is considered instrumental in remaking the Army's tarnished, post-Vietnam image and attracting new generations of highly motivated recruits.

Awards and decorations
  Master Parachutist Badge
  Joint Chiefs of Staff Identification Badge
  Army Staff Identification Badge

References

External links
 Arlington National Cemetery
 NCSU Military Bio
 State Grads Develop Army Manpower – April 1985  
 NCSU Army ROTC Bio
 NCSU Army ROTC Alumni – 1953

United States Army generals
Recipients of the Distinguished Service Medal (US Army)
Recipients of the Legion of Merit
United States Army personnel of the Vietnam War
Burials at Arlington National Cemetery
1931 births
1995 deaths
United States Army Field Artillery Branch personnel
North Carolina State University alumni
People from High Point, North Carolina
Deaths from leukemia
United States Army Vice Chiefs of Staff
Deaths from cancer in Washington, D.C.
United States Army Command and General Staff College alumni
Recipients of the Defense Distinguished Service Medal